Cumbola is a census-designated place located in Blythe Township, Schuylkill County in the state of Pennsylvania, United States. The community is located between the boroughs of New Philadelphia and Port Carbon along U.S. Route 209. As of the 2010 census the population was 443 residents.

Demographics

References 

Census-designated places in Schuylkill County, Pennsylvania
Census-designated places in Pennsylvania